The Warehouse premises of Hardware (Bristol) Limited is on Old Bread Street, Bristol, England.

It was built in 1882 by William Bruce Gingell in red brick with white and black brick details and is an example of the Bristol Byzantine style. It was originally part of Christopher Thomas and Brothers' soap works.

It has been designated by English Heritage as a grade II listed building.

References

See also
 Grade II listed buildings in Bristol

Hardware Ltd
Industrial buildings completed in 1882
Grade II listed buildings in Bristol
Grade II listed industrial buildings
Brick buildings and structures
Byzantine Revival architecture in the United Kingdom
1882 establishments in England